The Pakalomattam family is an ancient Marthoma Nasrani (Syrian Christian) family in Kerala, India.  According to the Royal Asiatic Society of Great Britain and Ireland, the family "solely supplied bishops and archdeacons to the Church [in India] till the beginning of the nineteenth century." The position of Archdeacon of All India (sometimes given as Arkkadiyakon of all India), who oversaw the whole Christian church in India, was with very few exceptions filled by a member of the Pakalomattan family for generations.

History

The Pakalomattam family originated from Brahmins, who were brought into the Christian faith by Saint Thomas the Apostle in AD 52.The Pakalomattam family traditionally held the historical offices of Arkkadiyakon of all India, who headed the Marthoma Nasranis in Kerala and later Malankara Metropolitan (from AD 1653 until AD 1816) which headed the Puthenkoor faction of Marthoma Nasranis. The Pakalomattam Tharavad was initially at Palayoor, but later in 4th Century they moved to Kuravilangad. Many branches of Pakalomattam later moved to different parts of Kerala, starting from 17th century, due to the division created between Puthenkoor and Pazhayakoor.

Traditionally it had been the privilege of the eldest priest belonging to Pakalomattam to be the Archdeacon of the Saint Thomas Christians. The position of Archdeacon is the highest clerical rank in the Church of the East after a bishop. He is the head of all the clerics belonging to a diocese and he is incharge of the cathedral church and represents the will of the bishop in his absence. Since India was an exterior province of the Church of the East and since the Patriarch reserved for himself the right to send Metropolitans to India, the effective ecclesiastical authority vested on the native Archdeacon. Archdeaconate was not just an ecclesiastical institution, but a socio-political and ethno-religious, princely authority, that represented the integrity of the Christian community of Hendo (India).

The legend

Palayoor was one of the places near the port of Muziris, where St. Thomas established a church. The place is referred to as Paloor in some old documents. At that time, according to tradition, Palayoor had a Brahmin village of families with the strength of 64 adults. It is believed that in one of the temple ponds in Palayoor, St. Thomas performed a miracle. Some  Brahmins were performing a Vedic ritual called Tharpanam which means "That offering which satisfies" in which they devote Lord Sun by the symbolic submission of water in their palms along with Vedic recitation. St. Thomas was attracted to the ritual and queried about the act and challenged the logic of their submission since the water was thrown above was not accepted and returned to earth. St. Thomas used this opportunity to present his subject before the present Brahmin community. St. Thomas threw water in the name of Jesus and it stood still in the air and glittered like a diamond. By this experience, many Brahmins accepted Christianity while the other Brahmins cursed the place and left the place with their families saying that they would do their rituals from then on at Vembanattu.

See also
 Jacob of Muttuchira
 Thoma of Villarvattom

References

http://pakalomattamfamily.org/history/
https://www.nasrani.net/2020/07/15/debate-on-the-apostolate-of-st-thomas-in-kerala-a-response/

External links
Pakalomattam family website

Pakalomattam family